Joy Castro is the award-winning author of the recently published novels, One Brilliant Flame, and Flight Risk, a finalist for a 2022 International Thriller Award; the post-Katrina New Orleans literary thrillers Hell or High Water, which received the Nebraska Book Award, and Nearer Home, which have been published in France by Gallimard’s historic Série Noire; the story collection How Winter Began; the memoir The Truth Book; and the essay collection Island of Bones, which received the International Latino Book Award. She is also editor of the craft anthology Family Trouble: Memoirists on the Hazards and Rewards of Revealing Family and the founding series editor of Machete, a series in innovative literary nonfiction at The Ohio State University Press. She served as the guest judge of CRAFT‘s first Creative Nonfiction Award, and her work has appeared in venues including Poets & Writers, Writer's Digest, Literary Hub, Crime Reads, The Rumpus, Ploughshares, The Brooklyn Rail, Senses of Cinema, Salon, Gulf Coast, Brevity, Afro-Hispanic Review, Seneca Review, Los Angeles Review of Books, and The New York Times Magazine. A former Writer-in-Residence at Vanderbilt University, she is currently the Willa Cather Professor of English and Ethnic Studies (Latinx Studies) at the University of Nebraska-Lincoln, where she directs the Institute for Ethnic Studies.

Early life and its influences on her writing 
Of her childhood in Miami, London (UK), and, from age 7 through high school graduation in West Virginia, Castro has said, "I came from a very restricted, oppressive background — I was first-gen, from a background of poverty, and from a fundamentalist Christian sect that did not believe, for example, in evolution or in voting — and yet somehow I had always been hungry for the life of the mind." Her award-winning work in nonfiction and fiction has explored her own history of abuse and Latinx identity, as well as political and social commentary, often under the guise of crime fiction, describing it as "the genre of justice." Moreover, "Socrates understood the power of revealing stories of violence, particularly violence done by the powerful, and he feared its effects upon the polis: the disruptive impact upon the state of telling precisely the kinds of micropolitical stories of violence that crime fiction features. Telling our stories can reshape the world."

Critical reception for recent works 
Of Flight Risk, Melissa Scholes Young said, in Fiction Writers Review: "Even when relying on our own roots, we are excavating the generations who walked this road before we set a foot upon it. Reclaiming those roots as part of our own identity rather than covering them for the smoother path is also an act of revolution, especially when that existence was impoverished. When the narrator in Flight Risk comments that hunger is a secret to keep and claims the shame of wanting food in an abundant world, there is a revelation that readers must wrestle with their own indictment in. If poverty is a feminist issue, we must not look away but rather consider how discriminations and prejudice of gender persist. Flight Risk rises to this challenge and reveals hope for a world where women might be valued and self-determining. There is beauty and peace in Isabel Morales’ vision of justice for herself and the land she loves."

Introducing Castro's recent short fiction, "Ein Haus am Meer," in The Brooklyn Rail, Will Chancellor said, "the story’s pacing, mood, and questioning achieve the aim of great ekphrasis: to capture transitory, elusive beauty and communicate its vital energy."

Castro's essays in particular are often adopted for course curriculums, and Megan Culhane Galbraith said, "I just used this piece by Joy Castro in my workshop last night. We discussed resilience and resistance and writing about risky subjects."

References

American memoirists
American women short story writers
American short story writers
Texas A&M University alumni
American adoptees
University of Nebraska–Lincoln faculty
Living people
Year of birth missing (living people)
American women poets
American women memoirists
American biographers
American academics of English literature
American women academics
21st-century American women